UV Pisces is a binary star system in the constellation of Pisces. With a peak apparent visual magnitude of 8.98, it is too faint to be visible to the naked eye. This is an eclipsing binary system that decreases to magnitude 10.05 during the primary eclipse, then to magnitude 9.54 with the secondary eclipse. It is located at a distance of 232 light years from the Sun based on parallax measurements, and is receding with a radial velocity of 6.5 km/s. The position of this star near the ecliptic means it is subject to lunar occultation.

This star was found to be variable by H. Huth in 1959. R. B. Carr in 1969 proposed this to be an Algol-type variable with a minor tidal distortion of the components, plus a large, anomalous asymmetry in the light curve. D. S. Hall in 1976 grouped it among the class of short-period RS CVn binaries. The following year, variable, non-thermal radio emission was detected coming from this system, the first such discovered for a short-period binary.

Daniel M. Popper in 1969 found a double-lined, G-type spectrum with both components showing emission in the H and K lines. In 1979, A. R. Sadik deduced the system is a detached binary and suggested a bright, hot spot may produce the observed asymmetry in the light curve. He found stellar classifications of G2V and K0IV for the primary and secondary components, respectively. With improved spectra, Popper found main sequence classes of G5 and K3 for the two stars. The presence of a prominence was deduced in 1992, and a flare of hydrogen alpha was observed the following year.

This is a close binary system with an orbital period of 0.86 days. The orbit is circular and the components are spinning rapidly in-sync with their orbital period. Magnetic activity cycles appear to be causing the orbital period to oscillate with a 61 year period. The primary is a G-type main-sequence star of about the same size and mass as the Sun, while the secondary is a smaller K-type main-sequence star. They are estimated to be about 4.6 billion years old.

References

Further reading

G-type main-sequence stars
K-type main-sequence stars
Algol variables
RS Canum Venaticorum variables
Spectroscopic binaries

Pisces (constellation)
Durchmusterung objects
007700
005980
Pisces, UV